Air India 182 is a 2008 documentary directed by Sturla Gunnarsson, and produced by David York. It is about the Air India Flight 182 bombing in 1985. The Canadian Broadcasting Corporation commissioned the film, which originally had the preliminary title Flight 182. Gunarsson stated that he hoped the film would cause Canadians to contemplate domestic terrorism.

The film includes interviews from family members of the deceased, and other figures, including Ujjal Dosanjh, Eisha Marjara, Lata Pada, and Renée Sarojini Saklikar. One of the associate producers, Judy Koonar, is Gunarsson's wife and of Punjabi origin. The color white represents death in the Indian cultures, so the interviews were screened on a white background. The film also incorporates transcripts, re-enactments, and documents related to the case.

The film premiered at the Hot Docs Canadian International Documentary Festival in April 2008, and in June of that year it was screened at the Vancity Theatre in Vancouver. Dave Hayer attended the Vancouver screening. The CBC planned to air the documentary on June 22 with no commercials.

Gunarsson argued that there were Sikh victims and therefore, as paraphrased by Charlie Smith of The Georgia Straight, "this wasn't a case of Sikhs attacking Hindus, because there were Sikh passengers." Smith argued that the conclusion about the sectarian nature was opposite of that made by The Sorrow and the Terror: The Haunting Legacy of the Air India Tragedy.

Cast

 Gurpreet Singh Chana - Inderjit Singh Reyat
 Baljinder Singh - Talwinder Singh Parmar
 Sarabjeet Singh - Hardial Singh Johal
 Ankush Kapoor - Surjan Singh Gill
 Rodney Ahluwalia - Rupudaman Singh Malik
 Justin Ward - Michael "Mike" Quinn (air traffic controller at Shannon Airport) 
 Adam D. Millard - Doug Henderson
 Jodie Graham - Ray Kobze

Amateur actors play the victims and family members.

Reception

Monika Bartyzel of Moviefone wrote that the recreations added to the film because they "keep the story clear" and add "tangible [scenes that make the film] real". She added that the scenes "[allow the audience] to become more intimately familiar with each person -- terrorist, victim, and official -- in a way that flushes out their stories."

References

External links
 
 
 

Canadian documentary films
2008 films
Air India Flight 182
Films set in 1985
2008 documentary films
Documentary films about India
Documentary films about aviation accidents or incidents
Films about terrorism in India
2000s Canadian films